is a passenger railway station located in the town of Onjuku, Chiba Prefecture Japan, operated by the East Japan Railway Company (JR East).

Lines

Station layout
Onjuku Station has a single island platform connected to a white-washed station building by a footbridge. The station has a Midori no Madoguchi staffed ticket office.

Platform

History
Onjuku Station was opened on 20 March 1913. It was absorbed into the JR East network upon the privatization of the Japan National Railways (JNR) on 1 April 1987.

Passenger statistics
In fiscal 2019, the station was used by an average of 522 passengers daily (boarding passengers only).

Surrounding area

See also
 List of railway stations in Japan

References

External links

 JR East Station information   

Railway stations in Japan opened in 1913
Railway stations in Chiba Prefecture
Sotobō Line
Stations of East Japan Railway Company
Onjuku